The Shinkot casket, also Bajaur reliquary of the reign of Menander, is a Buddhist reliquary from the Bajaur area in Gandhara, thought to mention the reign of the 2nd century BCE Indo-Greek king Menander I. The steatite casket is said to have contained a silver and a gold reliquary at the time of discovery, but they have been lost.

Inscription
This casket is probably the oldest known inscribed Buddhist relic casket from the area of Gandhara. One of its inscriptions, in the place of honour on the lid, mentions: Minedrasa maharajasa kaṭiasa divasa 44411, being translated as "On the 14th day of Kārtikka, in the reign of the Maharaja Minadra", the Maharaja ("Great King") Minadra in question being Menander. Menander is otherwise known from his coins, which are generally bilingual in Greek and Kharoshthi, where his Kharoshthi name is given as Menadra. On his coinage, the full title of king Menander appears as Menadrasa Maharajasa Trataresa "Saviour Great King Menander". In the Milindapanha, his name is given as Milinda.

A translation of the different fragments has been made:

The characters are very clear and without ambiguity. The "Great King Menander" segment (𐨨𐨁𐨣𐨡𐨿𐨪𐨯  𐨨𐨱𐨪𐨗𐨯, Minadrasa Maharajasa) also reads clearly. Paleographically, the shape of the letters of inscriptions C and D correspond to the period of the Indo-Scythian Northern Satraps of Taxila and Mathura in the 1st century BCE, and are lightly incised, almost only scratched, while the letters in A and B are characteristic of an earlier type, closer to the type of the Ashoka inscriptions in the Kharoshthi script, and are bold and deeply incised.

The later segments of the inscription were apparently made under the orders of Vijayamitra, king of the Apracarajas (ruled 12 BCE - 15 CE). He appears in D as Vijayamitra apracarajena, which, previously translated literally as "Vijayamitra, the King without adversaries", is now understood as "Vijayamitra, the King of the Apracas", an Indo-Scythian tribe now known from other archaeological remains from the region of Bajaur.

The authenticity of the inscription pertaining to Menander has been doubted by Harry Falk in 2005, but later upheld by Stefan Baums in his 2017 article on Gandharan inscriptions, "A framework for Gandharan chronology based on relic inscriptions".

The content of the inscriptions was fully published in 1937 in Epigraphia Indica, Vol.24, by Majumdar, who saw the casket in Calcutta, but its whereabouts are now unknown.

See also
 Bimaran casket

References

Baums, Stefan, and Andrew Glass. 2002– . Catalog of Gāndhārī Texts, no. CKI 176

Sources
 
 
 

2nd-century BC works
Archaeological discoveries in Pakistan
Bajaur District
Buddhist reliquaries
Indo-Greeks
Menander I